The eastern olivaceous warbler (Iduna pallida) is a small passerine bird with drab plumage tones, that is native to the Old World. For the most part it breeds in southeastern Europe, the Middle East and adjacent western Asia, and winters in the northern Afrotropics.

Relationships
The eastern olivaceous warbler (Iduna pallida) is a "warbler", formerly placed in the Old World warblers when these were a paraphyletic wastebin taxon. It is now considered a member of the acrocephaline warblers, Acrocephalidae, in the tree warbler genus Iduna. It was formerly regarded as part of a wider "olivaceous warbler" species, but as a result of modern taxonomic developments, this species is now usually considered distinct from the western olivaceous warbler, Iduna opaca.

Etymology
Keyserling and Blasius gave no explanation of the genus name Iduna. The specific pallida  is Latin for "pale".

Habits
This small passerine bird is found in dry open country, including cultivation, with bushes or some trees. Like most warblers it is insectivorous.

Range
It is migratory, wintering in sub-Saharan Africa or Arabia. It is a rare vagrant to northern Europe.

Breeding

The eastern olivaceous warbler breeds from southeastern Europe and the Middle East to western Asia, and the subspecies reiseri is thought to be locally common as a breeding species in southeast Morocco. Two or three eggs are laid in a nest which is placed low in a bush or in undergrowth.

Description
It is a medium-sized warbler, more like a very pale reed warbler than its relative the melodious warbler. The adult has a plain pale brown back and whitish underparts. The bill is strong and pointed and the legs grey. The sexes are identical, as with most warblers, but young birds are more buff on the belly. It has a characteristic downward tail flick.

The western olivaceous warbler differs from this species in being larger and having a browner tinge to the upperparts; it also has a larger bill. The eastern olivaceous warbler sometimes has a greenish tinge to its upperparts, and can be very difficult to separate from Sykes's warbler, Iduna rama. The song is a fast nasal babbling.

References

eastern olivaceous warbler
Birds of Europe
Birds of East Africa
Birds of North Africa
Birds of Central Asia
Birds of Western Asia
eastern olivaceous warbler
Taxa named by Christian Gottfried Ehrenberg
Taxa named by Wilhelm Hemprich